The Belrose Eagles are a rugby league team based in the suburb of Belrose in Sydney's Northern Beaches.  Founded in 1955, the club has fielded both junior and senior teams in the Manly-Warringah district competitions and since 2013 the semi-professional Sydney Shield competition in NSW, Australia. Their colours are red and gold. After returning to the A Grade competition in 2009, the Belrose Eagles were 2009 Premiers.

In 2013, Belrose joined the Sydney Shield competition and in their inaugural year claimed the premiership. Belrose were also Premiers in the A2 Manly Warringah Rugby League Competition that year.

Notable Juniors
Manly Warringah Sea Eagles legends Geoff Toovey and Jason King (rugby league) represented Belrose in their youth.

Belrose are part of the Manly-Warringah/North Sydney District Rugby League district competition.

Jim Beam Cup
The Belrose Eagles played in the NSWRL Jim Beam Cup from 2005 until 2009. Prior to this the highest level of competition for the club was in the Manly-Warringah and North Sydney district A-Grade competitions.  The Eagles did not make the finals of the Jim Beam Cup competition in any of the four years they participated. The Belrose Eagles returned to the Manly-Warringah/North Sydney district A-Grade competition in 2009 and went on to win this competition.

Sydney Shield
Belrose compete in the NSW Sydney Shield competition.  At the end of the 2019 Sydney Shield season, Belrose finished last on the table and claimed the wooden spoon.  It was a difficult year for Belrose as they managed only one victory and lost eighteen matches. In 2020, Belrose competed in the two iterations of the Sydney Shield: a single round in mid-March that was cancelled due to the COVID-19 pandemic in Australia and a reorganised competition that ran from July to September 2020.

See also

List of rugby league clubs in Australia

References

External links
 Belrose Eagles Official Site
 NSWRL Jim Beam Cup Site

Rugby league teams in Sydney
Rugby clubs established in 1955
1955 establishments in Australia
Belrose, New South Wales